Andrey Gorokhov (born 13 January 1960, Balkhash, Karaganda Region) is a Russian political figure and a deputy of 8th State Duma.

In 1987, he was appointed the head of the department at the Ministry of General Machine Building. From 1990 to 2001, he was the CEO of the JSC Mashcenter. In 2001–2007, he was the Senior Lecturer at the Moscow Institute of Economics and Law. Since 2011, he has been first a docent and, later, a professor, at the Moscow State University of Technology and Management, named after K.G Razumovsky. In 2011 he was also elected as a deputy of the Kaliningrad Regional Duma of the 5th convocation. Since September 2021, he has served as a deputy of the 8th State Duma from the Kaliningrad Oblast constituency.

On 24 March 2022, the United States Treasury sanctioned him in response to the 2022 Russian invasion of Ukraine.

References

1960 births
Living people
United Russia politicians
21st-century Russian politicians
Eighth convocation members of the State Duma (Russian Federation)
Russian individuals subject to the U.S. Department of the Treasury sanctions